Åsa Larsson (born 28 June 1966) is a Swedish crime-fiction writer. Although born in Uppsala, she was raised in Kiruna in the far north. Prior to becoming a full-time writer, Larsson was a tax lawyer, a profession she shares with the heroine of her novels, Rebecka Martinsson. Her first Rebecka Martinsson novel, Solstorm, was awarded the Swedish Crime Writers' Association prize for best first novel. It was published in the UK (under the title The Savage Altar) and was shortlisted for the Duncan Lawrie International Dagger. Her second Rebecka Martinsson novel, Det blod som spillts, won the Best Swedish Crime Novel Award. Till offer åt Molok, her fifth Rebecka Martinsson novel also won the Best Swedish Crime Novel Award. Her books and characters serve as the basis for the internationally successful TV series Rebecka Martinsson.

The 2007 Swedish film Solstorm was based on the book The Savage Altar.

She is a granddaughter of the Olympic skier Erik August Larsson.

Bibliography

Rebecka Martinsson novels
2003 –	Solstorm; English translation: Sun Storm (USA), The Savage Altar (UK), 2006
2004 – Det blod som spillts; English translation: The Blood Spilt, 2007 
2006 – Svart stig; English translation: The Black Path, 2008
2008 – Till dess din vrede upphör; English translation: Until Thy Wrath be Past, 2011
2011 – Till offer åt Molok; English translation: The Second Deadly Sin, 2014
2021 – Fädernas missgärningar; English translation: The Sins of Our Fathers, 2021

Other
2003 – Upptäck jorden
2005 - Aurinkomyrsky 
2007 – Systrarna Hietala (short stories)
2009 – Guds starka arm (with Lena Andersson) (short stories)
2012 – Tjernaja tropa

References

External links
Random House author page
Minabibliotek.se Åsa Larsson page

1966 births
Living people
People from Uppsala
Swedish women writers
Swedish crime fiction writers
Women mystery writers
Swedish mystery writers